= Tamas (Tangency) =

Book by Aroussia Nalouti

- Author: ʿArousiya Al-Nalouty
- Language: Arabic
- Genre: Literary fiction
- Published: 1995
- Publisher: Dar Al-Janoub Publishing
- Publication place: Tunisia
- Pages: 125

Tamas (Tangency) is the 1995 novel by the Tunisian writer ʿArousiya Al-Nalouty. It was ranked din the 39th position among the 100 best Arabic books list. In it, Al-Nalouty navigates women's liberation, believing that the women's revolution in Tunisia is not yet over.

== Summary ==
The novel centers on characters who are constantly being chased by misery and trouble, before having done anything to deserve so. In fact, it is usually through the mistakes of others. The novel tells the story of (Zainab Hassan) and her father. The story shows the dominance of Zainab's father, Qassem Abdeljabbar, who was raised by a dominant woman, leading him to become an insensitive man; so much so that even after his mother's death, showing his emotion is shameful to him. This aspect turns him into a feared man whose inner fragility gets exposed the moment he hugs his daughter.

== Other Works by ʿArousiya Al-Nalouty ==
=== Novels ===
- Maratij (Locks) (1985)
- Tamas (Tangency)(1995)

=== Short story collections ===
- Juha (1974)
- Al-Buʿdul Khamis (The Fifth Dimension) (1975)
